Jaime Oncins (born 16 June 1970) is a former professional tennis player from Brazil.

Oncins represented his native country at the 1992 Summer Olympics in Barcelona, where he reached the quarterfinals before falling to Russia's Andrei Cherkasov. The right-hander won two individual career titles (Bologna and Búzios, both in 1992). He reached his highest singles ATP-ranking on May 3, 1993, when he became world no. 34.

Oncins' best performance at a major was at the 1992 French Open, where he reached the Round of 16, losing to eventual finalist, Petr Korda. In the second round of the tournament, Oncins had a famous victory from two sets down against former world no. 1 and three-time French Open champion, Ivan Lendl. Oncins was also the last player that Jimmy Connors beat at the US Open. Connors beat Oncins in straight sets in the first round of the 1992 US Open.

Oncins was a runner-up in the Roland Garros mixed doubles in 2001, with Paola Suárez from Argentina.

Grand Slam finals

Mixed doubles (1 runner-up)

ATP career finals

Singles: 5 (2 titles, 3 runner-ups)

Doubles: 11 (5 titles, 6 runner-ups)

ATP Challenger and ITF Futures finals

Singles: 13 (8–5)

Doubles: 17 (11–6)

Performance timelines

Singles

Doubles

External links
 
 
 

1970 births
Living people
Brazilian male tennis players
Olympic tennis players of Brazil
Tennis players from São Paulo
Tennis players at the 1992 Summer Olympics
Tennis players at the 2000 Summer Olympics
20th-century Brazilian people
21st-century Brazilian people